Vicky Steiner (born January 1, 1956) is an American politician who has served in the North Dakota House of Representatives from the 37th district since 2010.

References

1956 births
Living people
Republican Party members of the North Dakota House of Representatives
21st-century American politicians
21st-century American women politicians
People from Dickinson, North Dakota
Women state legislators in North Dakota